The Chadwick Beach cotton mouse (Peromyscus gossypinus restrictus) is a presumably extinct subspecies of the cotton mouse. It was confined to a small area on the Manasota Key Peninsula in Florida.

Description
It was smaller and paler than the nominate subspecies. The total length was 172 mm, the tail length 72.5 mm, the hind foot length 22.3 mm, the ear length 22.3 mm, and largest skull length was 27.6 mm. The zygomatic breadth was 13.9 mm, the preorbital breadth was 4.4 mm, the nasal length was 10.9 mm, and the length of the teeth in the maxilla was 3.9 mm. The upper parts were pink cinnamon, with a rufous hue in the middle of the back. The under parts were white with a pale pink buff wash on the chest. The tail was brown above and buff below. The dorsal stripe in the middle of the back was smaller than in the nominate race.

Distribution
The mouse was primarily found in the Chadwick Beach area at Englewood in Sarasota County and Englewood Beach in the southern part of Englewood, Florida, in Charlotte County.

Habitat and ecology
It preferred maritime forests with closed canopies. Characteristic trees of these forests are Sabal palmetto, Quercus virginiana, and Juniperus virginiana var. silicicola. It was also found on sand dunes where sea oats (Uniola paniculata), a high growing grass species, is the dominant vegetation. Like the nominate subspecies, the Chadwick Beach cotton mouse was nocturnal. The ecology of this subspecies is not studied.

Extinction
It is only known by 15 specimens collected by Luther C. Goldman in March 1938. It is now presumed extinct after extensive surveys in 1984, 1985, 1988, and 1989 failed to find the mouse again. Causes for its disappearance might have been the deforestation of the maritime forests in the southernmost part of Sarasota County, as well as predation by feral cats.

References

Stephen R. Humphrey (Edit.): Rare and Endangered Biota of Florida. Volume 1. Mammals. University Press of Florida, Gainesville, 1992. 
Arthur H. Howell: Descriptions of Five New Mammals from Florida. Journal of Mammalogy, Vol. 20, No. 3 (Aug., 1939). American Society of Mammalogists: p 363-365

External links
NatureServe Report
Chadwick Beach Cotton Mouse Survey

Peromyscus
Extinct rodents
Species made extinct by human activities
Rodent extinctions since 1500
1938 in the environment
Mammals described in 1939
Taxa named by Arthur H. Howell